Tasikoyo (also, To-si-ko-yo and Tusikweyo) is a former Maidu village in Plumas County, California. It lay at an elevation of 3,553 feet (1,083 m). The site is now in Taylorsville.

References

Former populated places in California
Maidu villages
Former settlements in Plumas County, California